Balmaceda Park is an urban park along the Mapocho River in Providencia, Santiago de Chile. It was originally created under the name of Parque Japonés (Japanese Park) in 1930. When Chile joined the Allies during the World War II, its name was changed to Parque Gran Bretaña (Great Britain Park). Afterwards, the name was changed to its current name.

The park is adjacent to Plaza Baquedano. Toward the west, the park continues into Santiago as Parque Forestal. On the opposite bank of the river is the Barrio Bellavista.

References

Urban public parks
Parks in Santiago, Chile